NBA all-time teams may refer to:

Top 10 Teams in NBA History
NBA anniversary teams